Jerzy Respondek (born 1977 in Ruda Śląska, Poland) is a Polish computer scientist and mathematician, professor at Silesian University of Technology, Gliwice.

His research interests cover numerical methods and mathematical control theory. Respondek is best known for his works on special matrices and their applications in control theory.

Life and career
In 2001 he graduated from Silesian University of Technology obtaining two MSc degrees: in computer science and mathematical control theory. In 2003 he obtained PhD in computer science on the basis of the dissertation “Numerical aspects of differential operators spectral theory” under supervision of Jerzy Klamka, a known Polish mathematician. In 2016 he obtained DSc from Poznan University of Technology, a widely recognized faculty, considered the most prestigious Polish department in computer science.

Respondek lectured in numerous universities, such as the mathematics department of the University of Pisa (Italy), computer departments of universities of Valencia (Spain), Nuremberg (Germany), Alcala (Spain) and the Department of Computer Science of the University of Manchester (UK), Alan Turing's domestic department.

Respondek serves as member of scientific committees of most prestigious conferences in mathematics and computer science. He also delivered plenary lectures at world known mathematics and computer science conferences, like International Conference on Computational Science and its Applications (2015) and European Simulation and Modelling Conference (2014, 2020).

Other activities
In 2008-17 he participated in the editorial board of the journal "Mathematics and Computers in Simulation", the main journal of the IMACS organization, recognized by the numerical methods scientists community. Since 2020 he participates in the editorial board of the journal "International Journal of Systems Science".

In 2008 obtained prestigious stipend for researchers founded by world recognized Polish weekly "Polityka".

In 2012-13 Respondek belonged to one of the main advisory groups of the Polish Ministry of Science. Between 2014-16 he worked in the science-popularization advisory group of that ministry.

As a delegate of these two groups he participated in the proceedings of the National Parliamentary Commission of Education, Science and Youth in Warsaw.

In 2007-08 he was a member of the Forecast Committee of the Polish Academy of Sciences in Warsaw. It is a specialized, national think tank cooperating with the Club of Rome. His works in that group pertained mainly to the social and economic aspects of computer science.

Respondek co-organized the meeting (18 April 2013, Warsaw) with the Nobel Prize Winner Prof. Robert Huber, German biochemist awarded in 1988 for Chemistry.

In 1996 he was the winner of the national edition of International Physics Olympiad at the voivodeship level.

Since 2018 he shares his time between Poland and Brussels where he works in the European Research Executive Agency (REA) as an expert of the Era Chairs – a European program within the H2020 framework, designed to support European universities to hire outstanding scientists. Since 2022 is an expert of EISMEA – a European agency that provides financial support to small and medium-sized enterprises and helps them find research partners.

Selected publications
 2005. “Controllability of dynamical systems with constraints”. Systems and Control Letters; 54 (4), pp. 293–314.
 2011. “On the confluent Vandermonde matrix calculation algorithm”. Applied Mathematics Letters; 24 (2), pp. 103–106.
 2011. “Numerical recipes for the high efficient inverse of the confluent Vandermonde matrices”. Applied Mathematics and Computation; 218 (5), pp. 2044–2054.
 2016. “Incremental numerical recipes for the high efficient inversion of the confluent Vandermonde matrices”. Computers and Mathematics with Applications; 71 (2), pp. 489–502.

References

1977 births
Living people
Polish computer scientists
Silesian University of Technology alumni
Academic staff of the Silesian University of Technology